Victor Ekarv (born January 31, 1994) is a Swedish professional ice hockey player. He is currently an unrestricted free agent who was most recently under contract with Luleå HF of the Swedish Hockey League (SHL).

Ekarv made his Swedish Hockey League debut playing with AIK IF during the 2013–14 SHL season.

References

External links

1994 births
Living people
AIK IF players
Almtuna IS players
Asplöven HC players
Luleå HF players
Swedish ice hockey centres
Sportspeople from Uppsala